Don Budge defeated Gottfried von Cramm in the final, 6–3, 6–4, 6–2 to win the gentlemen's singles tennis title at the 1937 Wimbledon Championships. Fred Perry was the defending champion, but was ineligible to compete after turning professional at the end of the 1936 season.

Seeds

  Don Budge (champion)
  Gottfried von Cramm (final)
  Henner Henkel (quarterfinals)
  Bunny Austin (semifinals)
  Bryan Grant (quarterfinals)
  Roderich Menzel (first round)
  Vivian McGrath (quarterfinals)
  Frank Parker (semifinals)

Draw

Finals

Top half

Section 1

Section 2

Section 3

Section 4

Bottom half

Section 5

Section 6

Section 7

Section 8

References

External links
 

Men's Singles
Wimbledon Championship by year – Men's singles